Paysandú is a city in western Uruguay.

Paysandu may also refer to:

Places
 Paysandú, a Uruguayan city on the River Uruguay
 Paysandú Airport, the airport serving Paysandú, Uruguay
 Paysandú Department, a political division of Uruguay
 Chacras de Paysandú, a densely populated rural area of Paysandú Department, Uruguay
 Nuevo Paysandú, a suburb of Paysandú, Uruguay
 Paysandú-Colón Bridge, a former denomination of the General Artigas Bridge

History
 Siege of Paysandú (1864-1865), an episode of the Uruguayan War

Sports
 Clube Esportivo Paysandu, a former Brazilian football club based in Brusque, Santa Catarina state
 Club Paysandú Bella Vista, a Uruguayan football club from Paysandú
 Paysandú Fútbol Club, a football club from Paysandú
 Paysandu Sport Club, a Brazilian football club located in Belém, Pará

Food
 A type of ham or tongue (cooked meat) popular in Victorian times featured in The Diary of a Nobody by George and Weedon Grossmith